Superman Lives may refer to:

 Superman in film § Superman Lives, a planned Superman film that was cancelled in 1998
 The Death of "Superman Lives": What Happened?, a 2015 documentary about the cancelled film
 Superman: Doomsday & Beyond, a 1993 novel also released as Superman Lives!